is a railway station in Nobeoka, Miyazaki, Japan.

Lines

Layout 
The station consists of two side platforms serving two tracks at grade with two sidings branching off track 1. There is no station building, only a shed at the station entrance which serves as a waiting room. Access to the opposite side platform is by means of a footbridge.

Adjacent stations

History
In 1913, the  had opened a line from  northwards to Hirose (now closed). After the Miyazaki Prefectural Railway was nationalized on 21 September 1917, Japanese Government Railways (JGR) undertook the subsequent extension of the track as part of the then Miyazaki Main Line, reaching Tomitaka (now ) by 11 October 1921. Totoro was opened on the same day as an intermediate station on the new track. Expanding north in phases and joining up with other networks, the track eventually reached  and the entire stretch from Kokura through Totoro to Miyakonojō was redesignated as the Nippō Main Line on 15 December 1923. With the privatization of Japanese National Railways (JNR), the successor of JGR, on 1 April 1987, Totoro came under the control of JR Kyushu.

Passenger statistics
In fiscal 2016, the station was used by an average of 67 passengers (boarding only) per day.

See also
List of railway stations in Japan

References

External links 

Totoro (JR Kyushu)

Railway stations in Miyazaki Prefecture
Railway stations in Japan opened in 1922
Nobeoka, Miyazaki